Typhoon Helen was the most destructive tropical cyclone to strike Japan during the 1972 Pacific typhoon season. Originating from a tropical disturbance on September 11 near the Northern Mariana Islands, Helen gradually intensified as it moved northwestward. By September 14, it reached typhoon strength and soon turned northeast towards Japan. Accelerating due to a trough over the East China Sea, Helen rapidly approached the country and made landfall near Cape Kushimoto as a Category 3-equivalent typhoon on the Saffir–Simpson Hurricane Scale. Later that day, a weakened Helen emerged into the Sea of Japan. After merging with an upper-level low, the storm transitioned into an extratropical cyclone on September 19 and was last noted two days later after moving through southern Hokkaido.

A total of 4,213 homes were destroyed and another 146,547 were damaged as a result of flash flooding and landslides. Numerous vessels ran aground due to rough seas associated with the storm, including several thousand ton cargo freighters. In all, 87 fatalities and $102 million in damage was attributed to Typhoon Helen.

Meteorological history

In early September 1972, a tropical disturbance developed within a near-equatorial trough near the Northern Mariana Islands. On September 11, the Japan Meteorological Agency (JMA) began monitoring this system as a tropical depression shortly after moving through the island chain. Initially, the system tracked southwestward before turning northwestward along the edge of a ridge. On September 13, a United States Air Force reconnaissance plane flew into the system and found that it had intensified into a tropical storm. At this time, the Joint Typhoon Warning Center (JTWC) began monitoring the newly named Tropical Storm Helen. Additionally, the Philippine Atmospheric, Geophysical and Astronomical Services Administration began warning on the system, assigning it the local name Paring. The following day, Helen attained typhoon status as it turned northward. Subsequently, a deepening trough over the East China Sea caused the typhoon to turn north-northeastward and accelerate.

Around this time, surface winds were estimated to be the same, making Helen a Category 3 equivalent on the Saffir–Simpson Hurricane Scale. Later that day, the storm made landfall near Cape Kushimoto. In Shionomisaki Lighthouse, just west of where the center of Helen passed, a barometric pressure of 955 mbar (hPa; 28.26 inHg) was recorded, the lowest in relation to the storm. As the system neared Hokkaido, it slowed down and began a multi-day anticyclonic loop. During this period, it merged with an upper-level low and transitioned into an extratropical cyclone on September 19. The remnants of Helen then tracked across southern Hokkaido before dissipating just east of the island on September 21.

Impact

Prior to the typhoon's arrival, officials in Japan warned residents of heavy rains. The Japanese National Railways network suspended service to areas threatened by the storm, stranding numerous people. By September 18, approximately one sixth of the railway service was canceled or delayed.

These winds caused a citywide power outage in Tsu, Mie and scattered outages in Nagoya. Over a substantial portion of the country, the storm produced torrential rains that triggered deadly flash floods. Peak rainfall in Honshu and Hokkaido reached , respectively. In Shikoku, ten people died after a landslide destroyed nine homes in Kōchi City. Across Japan, a total of 4,213 homes were destroyed and another 146,547 were damaged, leaving at least 3,000 people homeless. Roads and bridges sustained extensive damage, with large stretches being washed out. According to police in Tokyo, 140 bridges sustained damage. In Higashimatsuyama, a tornado spawned by Helen destroyed eight homes.

Large swells from the storm caused large vessels to wash ashore, including a 9,000 ton freighter in Ise Bay. Twenty-four fishermen drowned off the coast of Hachijō-jima after two vessels sank. Throughout Japan, 322 ships were either damaged or ran aground due to the storm. Including offshore, Helen killed 85 people in Japan. Along the east coast of South Korea, these swells resulted in two fatalities.

On September 17, the Japanese military was mobilized to assist in relief efforts. In all, 87 fatalities, 158 injuries and $102 million in damage was attributed to Typhoon Helen, making it the most destructive tropical cyclone to strike Japan in 1972.

See also

 Other storms of the same name
 1972 Pacific typhoon season

Notes

References

External links
Japan Meteorological Agency
Joint Typhoon Warning Center 

1972 Pacific typhoon season
Typhoons in Japan
Typhoon Helen
Typhoon Helen
Typhoons